Efraín Ernesto Aguilar Góngora (born 7 November 1964) is a Mexican politician from the Institutional Revolutionary Party. From 2009 to 2012 he served as Deputy of the LXI Legislature of the Mexican Congress representing Yucatán.

References

1964 births
Living people
Politicians from Yucatán (state)
Deputies of the LXI Legislature of Mexico
Institutional Revolutionary Party politicians
21st-century Mexican politicians
Universidad Autónoma de Yucatán alumni
Members of the Congress of Yucatán
20th-century Mexican lawyers
Members of the Chamber of Deputies (Mexico) for Yucatán